Mladenko Mišković (born 18 February 1942 in Metković) is a former Croatian handball player.

Sources
Petar Orgulić - 50 godina rukometa u Rijeci (2005), Adria public

References

Yugoslav male handball players
RK Zamet players
RK Zamet coaches
ŽRK Zamet coaches
Sportspeople from Metković
Handball players from Rijeka
1942 births
Living people